Yis is a Torricelli language of Papua New Guinea.

References

Wapei languages
Languages of Sandaun Province